Mirza Hossein-Qoli, also known as Agha Mirza Hosseingholi Farahani (1853 in Tehran – 1916  in Tehran) was a musician and tar player. He and his older brother Mirza Abdollah started learning music from their father Ali Akbar Farahani.

Further reading
Haghighat, A., Honarmandan e Irani az Aghaz ta Emrooz, Koomesh Publication, 2004, (in Persian)
Khaleghi, R., Sargozasht e Musighi e Iran, Ferdowsi Publication, 1955, (in Persian)

1854 births
1916 deaths
Musicians from Tehran
Qajar courtiers
19th-century Iranian musicians
20th-century Iranian musicians